The Stielgranate 41 (German: "stick grenade"; model 1941) was a German shaped charge, fin-stabilized shell, used with the 3.7 cm Pak 36 anti-tank gun to give it better anti-tank performance.

The 3.7 cm PaK-36, was the standard anti-tank gun of the Wehrmacht in 1940. During the battle of France in 1940 it had trouble dealing with thick armour of French and British tanks. In 1941, when Germany invaded the USSR, the gun was next to useless when confronted with Russian T-34 or KV-series tanks. It was successively replaced by larger calibre weapons, like the 5 cm PaK 38, but there were never enough of them, so it was decided to enhance the capability of the PaK 36 by providing it with new ammunition.

The design looked like a rifle grenade, only considerably larger. One part of its stem, a stick, was placed inside the gun barrel; the other part, a perforated tube, fitted around it. On the tube there were six stabilizing fins.

It was equipped with two fuzes: in the nose, for direct hits, and in the base, to ensure detonation if the target was only grazed. The large calibre of the HEAT warhead and shaped charge of 2.42 kg HE, enabled it to penetrate armour 180 mm thick, enough to defeat any World War II tank. The hit was equally dangerous at any distance, as the shaped-charge effect is not dependent on the velocity of the round at the point of impact. However, due to low velocity the grenade was not very accurate, so the effective range against tanks was around 300 m.

Another disadvantage of using Stielgranate was that the gun loader had to leave cover, go in front of the gun and place another grenade on the barrel.

Specifications
 Weight as fired: 8.6 kg
 Explosive content:
 TNT, 2.42 kg, shaped charge
 Total length: 73.9 cm
 Stem diameter: 37 mm
 Warhead diameter: 160 mm
 Fuzes
 base fuze Bd Z 5130 - Bodenzünder 5130
 nose fuze AZ 5075 - Aufschlagzünder 5075 (identical with the one used for Panzerschreck rockets) or its improved variant  AZ 5095 - Aufschlagzünder 5095

References

Artillery shells
Anti-tank rounds
World War II weapons of Germany
Weapons and ammunition introduced in 1941